Catullus 9 is a Latin poem of eleven lines in Phalaecean metre by the Roman poet Catullus.

Text

Analysis 
E. T. Merrill calls the poem "an expression of joy" over the return of Veranius, the poet's friend, from Spain. Such expeditions to the colonies on the part of young Romans of that day were common: compare Fabullus in Catullus 28.

In his Victorian translation of Catullus, R. F. Burton titles the poem "To Veranius returned from Travel".

References

Sources 
 Burton, Richard F.; Smithers, Leonard C., eds. (1894). The Carmina of Caius Valerius Catullus. London: Printed for the Translators: for Private Subscribers. pp. 15–16.
 Merrill, Elmer Truesdell, ed. (1893). Catullus (College Series of Latin Authors). Boston, MA: Ginn and Company. pp. xxv, xliii, 19–20.

External links 
 C. Valerius Catullus. "Catul. 9". Carmina. Leonard C. Smithers, ed. Perseus Digital Library. Retrieved 3 March 2023.

C009
Articles containing video clips